Kevin Matthew Puts   (born January 3, 1972) is an American composer, best known for winning a Pulitzer Prize in 2012 for his first opera, Silent Night.

Early life and education
Puts was born in St. Louis, Missouri, and grew up in Alma, Michigan. He studied composition and piano at the Eastman School of Music and Yale University, earning the Doctor of Musical Arts degree from Eastman School of Music.  Among his teachers were Samuel Adler, Jacob Druckman, David Lang, Christopher Rouse, Joseph Schwantner, Martin Bresnick, and, in piano, Nelita True. He also studied at the Tanglewood Music Festival with William Bolcom and Bernard Rands.

Career
He is composer-in-residence at the Fort Worth Symphony and has received a commission from the Aspen Music Festival.  His Cello Concerto was premiered by Yo-Yo Ma.  Puts's works have been performed by the St. Louis Symphony, the Pacific Symphony, the Utah Symphony (with Evelyn Glennie as percussion soloist), the Miró Quartet, and Concertante. He is a frequent composer in residence at the Cabrillo Festival of Contemporary Music, which commissioned his fourth symphony and his flute concerto.

His alma mater reports: 
For several years, Kevin Puts received reviews describing him as a "promising composer" and "a young composer to watch". But with a flurry of recent performances and prestigious commissions, Puts can now be described as one of America's most important composers, period.

Puts was Associate Professor of Composition at the University of Texas at Austin from 1997 to 2005 and now teaches composition at the Peabody Institute of Johns Hopkins University. His notable students include Jake Runestad and Viet Cuong.

The opera Silent Night, with score by Puts and libretto by Mark Campbell, was published by Aperto Press in 2011 and premiered by the Minnesota Opera on November 12. Puts won the annual Pulitzer Prize for Music in 2012; the citation called the piece "a stirring opera that recounts the true story of a spontaneous ceasefire [the 1914 Christmas truce] among Scottish, French and Germans during World War I, displaying versatility of style and cutting straight to the heart."

Awards
 American Academy of Arts and Letters composition prize
 2001 Guggenheim Fellow
 1996-1998 Young Concert Artists Composer-in-Residence 
 2002 Rome Prize of the American Academy in Rome.
 2008 Opera Fund Awards, The Minnesota Opera: Silent Night 
 2012 Pulitzer Prize for Music for Silent Night (libretto by Mark Campbell)
 2023 Grammy Award for Best Contemporary Classical Composition for Contact

Selected works

Orchestra
Network (1997), commissioned and premiered by the California Symphony Orchestra, Barry Jekowsky, conductor
Symphony No. 1 (1999), commissioned and premiered by the California Symphony Orchestra, Barry Jekowsky, conductor
Falling Dream (2001), commissioned and premiered by the American Composers Orchestra/BMI Foundation, Dennis Russell Davies, conductor
John Brown's Body for Narrator and Orchestra (2001), commissioned and premiered by the Pacific Symphony Orchestra, Jack Everly, conductor
Inspiring Beethoven (2001), commissioned and premiered by the Phoenix Symphony, Michael Hermann, conductor
Millennium Canons (2001), commissioned and premiered by the Boston Pops Orchestra and Hanson Institute for American Music, Keith Lockhart, conductor
Symphony No. 2, Island of Innocence (2002), commissioned by the Barlow Foundation, premiered by the Cincinnati Symphony/Paavo Jaarvi conductor and Utah Symphony/Keith Lockhart conductor
...this noble company (2003), commissioned and premiered by the Atlanta Symphony, Jere Flint, conductor
River's Rush (2004), commissioned and premiered by the Saint Louis Symphony in celebration of the orchestra's 125th anniversary, Leonard Slatkin, conductor
Symphony No. 3, Vespertine (2004), commissioned by Kathryn Gould and Meet the Composer through Magnum Opus, premiered by the Marin Symphony, Alasdair Neale, conductor
Symphony No. 4, from Mission San Juan (2007), commissioned by the Cabrillo Festival for Contemporary Music, premiered by the Cabrillo Festival Orchestra, Marin Alsop, conductor
Two Mountain Scenes (2007), commissioned and premiered by the New York Philharmonic and the Bravo! Vail Valley Music Festival, Bramwell Tovey, conductor
Hymn to the Sun (2008), commissioned and premiered by the Sun Valley Summer Symphony, Alasdair Neale, conductor
The City (2016), commissioned and premiered by the Baltimore Symphony Orchestra, co-commissioned by Carnegie Hall and the Cabrillo Festival, Marin Alsop, conductor
Silent Night Elegy (cut from his opera Silent Night) (2018), commissioned and premiered by the San Francisco Symphony, co-commissioned by the Saint Louis Symphony Orchestra and the Indianapolis Symphony Orchestra, Cristian Măcelaru, conductor
Virelai (after Guillaume de Machaut) (2019), commissioned and premiered by the Saint Louis Symphony Orchestra, Stéphane Denève, conductor

Wind Ensemble
Chorus of Light (2003), commissioned and premiered by the University of Texas Wind Ensemble, Jerry Junkin, conductor
Millennium Canons (band version arr. Mark Spede) (2003), commissioned and premiered by The University of Texas Wind Ensemble, Jerry Junkin, conductor

SATB Choir
To Touch the Sky (2012), SSAATTBB, commissioned by the Thelma Hunter Fund of the American Composers Forum and Conspirare, Craig Hella Johnson, conductor
If I Were A Swan (2012), SSAATTBB, commissioned by the Thelma Hunter Fund of the American Composers Forum and Conspirare, Craig Hella Johnson, conductor

Concertos
Concerto for Marimba and Orchestra (1997), commissioned by the Vermont Symphony Orchestra and the Kobe Ensemble of Japan, Makoto Nakura, marimba
Concerto for Oboe and Strings No. 1 (1997), commissioned by the National Symphony Orchestra, Rudolph Vrbsky, oboe
Concerto for Percussion and Orchestra (2006), commissioned by Orange County's Pacific Symphony and the Utah Symphony
Sinfonia Concertante (2006), commissioned by the Minnesota Orchestra
Concerto for Violin and Orchestra (2006), commissioned by Mr. and Mrs. Sid R. Bass for the Fort Worth Symphony Orchestra, Michael Shih, violin; Miguel Harth-Bedoya, conductor
Vision (Concerto for Cello and Orchestra) (2006), commissioned by the Aspen Music Festival in honor of David Zinman's 70th birthday, Yo-Yo Ma, cello; David Zinman, conductor
Nā Pali Coast (Concerto for Horn and Orchestra) (2008), commissioned by the Mobile Symphony, Jeff Leenhouts, horn; Scott Speck, conductor
Night (Concerto for Piano and Orchestra) (2008), commissioned by the Los Angeles Chamber Orchestra, Jeffrey Kahane, piano and conductor
Concerto for Clarinet and Orchestra (2009), commissioned by Kathryn Gould through Meet the Composer, premiered by Colorado Symphony Orchestra, Bil Jackson, clarinet; Jeffrey Kahane, conductor
Concerto for Flute and Orchestra (2013), commissioned by Bette and Joe Hirsch, premiered by the Cabrillo Music Festival Orchestra, Adam Walker, flute; Carolyn Kuan, conductor
Moonlight (Concerto for Oboe and Strings No. 2) (2016), commissioned by the Baltimore Symphony Orchestra, Peter Cooper, oboe; Brett Mitchell, conductor

Song cycle
The Brightness of Light (2019)

Opera
Silent Night (2011)
The Manchurian Candidate (2015)
Elizabeth Cree (2017)
The Hours (2022)

References

External links
 
 

1972 births
American classical composers
American male classical composers
American opera composers
Male opera composers
Pulitzer Prize for Music winners
Texas classical music
Musicians from St. Louis
Eastman School of Music alumni
Yale University alumni
Peabody Institute faculty
20th-century classical composers
21st-century classical composers
Living people
Pupils of Jacob Druckman
21st-century American composers
20th-century American composers
Classical musicians from Missouri
20th-century American male musicians
21st-century American male musicians